Panagiotis Tsalouchidis (born 30 March 1963) is a Greek former footballer who played professionally from 1983 to 1999 for Veria, Olympiacos and PAOK, making 500 league appearances in Greek football.

Tsalouchidis also represented Greece at international level, earning 76 caps between 1987 and 1995, and representing his nation at the 1994 FIFA World Cup.

He is sometimes referred to by his diminutive Giotis (Γιώτης).

Post-playing career
On 26 August 2015, Tsalouchidis was appointed as team manager of Veria. The former club player, who's also considered as a club legend, joined his former team, replacing Giorgos Lanaris.

References

External links
 
 Profile at PlayerHistory.com

1963 births
Living people
Footballers from Veria
Greek footballers
Greece international footballers
Olympiacos F.C. players
PAOK FC players
Veria F.C. players
Super League Greece players
1994 FIFA World Cup players
Aris Thessaloniki F.C. non-playing staff
Veria F.C. managers
Association football midfielders
Greek football managers